Paul Hâldan (born 12 April 1965 in Craiova, Romania) is a Romanian-born  Dutch professional table tennis player.

After a match in the Netherlands in 1983, Hâldan defected, resulting in a 2-year ban for international matches instigated by the Romanian table tennis federation. Only after obtaining his Dutch citizenship in 1986/87 could he participate again internationally, resulting in a relative short career.

Career highlights

Summer Olympic Games
1992, Barcelona, men's singles, last 16
World Championships
1991, Chiba, men's singles, last 32
1993, Gothenburg, men's singles, last 32
World Team Cup:
1990, Hokkaidō, 5th
European Championships
1988, Paris, men's singles, quarter final
1990, Gothenburg, men's singles, quarter final
European Top-12 Championships
1991, Den Bosch, 11th

References

External links
 ITTF Profile

1965 births
Living people
Sportspeople from Craiova
Romanian emigrants to the Netherlands
Dutch male table tennis players
Romanian male table tennis players
Table tennis players at the 1992 Summer Olympics
Romanian defectors